Estadio San Cristóbal is a stadium in Chiriquí Province, Panama.  It is currently used mostly for football matches and is the home stadium of Atlético Chiriquí.

Buildings and structures in Chiriquí Province
Football venues in Panama